Dante's View is a viewpoint terrace at  height, on the north side of Coffin Peak, along the crest of the Black Mountains, overlooking Death Valley.

Viewpoint
From the Dante's View parking lot, visitors can take several paths, one of which leads to the very brink of the edge, offering a dramatic panoramic view. Another path leads north  to a rest area with picnic tables. The best time to visit Dante's View is in the cooler morning hours, when the sun is in the east. Dante's View has a perfect view for night time star viewing with telescopes.

General
Dante's View provides a panoramic view of the southern Death Valley basin. To the West, across Badwater Basin, the Panamint Range rises dramatically to Telescope Peak. To the east is found the Greenwater Range.

 A part of the Devil's Golf Course is to the west-northwest, where it appears like a great sparkling ocean - instead it is solid halite salt.
 to the west-northwest, directly under Dante's View, is the Badwater Basin.

 west across the Badwater Basin, lies the Panamint Range, with Trail Canyon, Death Valley Canyon and Hanaupah Canyon visible. At the crest of the Panamints, Telescope Peak  is  distant.

 to the south, the Owlshead Mountains.
 east is seen the Great Basin ranges of Nevada.

Etymology
Dante's View is named from Dante Alighieri, who wrote the Divina Commedia (Divine Comedy), in which there are described the nine circles of Hell, the seven terraces of Purgatory and the nine spheres of Paradise.

In April 1926, some businessmen of the Pacific Coast Borax Company, informed of the touristic attractiveness of Death Valley, were trying to pick the best view of Death Valley. They had nearly chosen Chloride Cliff in the Funeral Mountains when the Deputy Sheriff of Greenwater, Charlie Brown, carried them from this peak a little distance to the Black Mountains. The group was immediately persuaded and promptly called this point Dante's View.

Geological

Dante's View is part of the Black Mountains, a part of Amargosa Range, that was geological Mesozoic volcanoes. 
These mountains were created when the surface of the earth was being stretched, forming a horst or a pulling force, forming grabens. The crust ruptured because of this force, and as a result, lava erupted and ended up deposited on top of the preceding sedimentary rock.

In popular culture
Dante's View was used as a filming location for the 1977 film Star Wars as the characters overlook the fictional Tatooine spaceport of Mos Eisley (which was added into the scene as a matte painting). That view point is Dante's View.

See also

 Places of interest in the Death Valley area
 Death Valley pupfish
 Racetrack Playa
 Richard Benyo
 Stan Jones (songwriter)
 Mark Calaway

Bibliography
 Dante's View by National Park Service (NPS)
 Dante's View by Geological Survey (USGS)

References

External links
 
 Dante's View 3D pictures
 Dante's View pictures
 Research on the geology of Death Valley
 Dante's View video November 2006

Death Valley
Death Valley National Park
Landforms of California
Landforms of Inyo County, California
Landforms of San Bernardino County, California
Dante Alighieri
Scenic viewpoints in the United States
Horsts (geology)